This is a list of members of the Australian Senate from 1987 to 1990. It consisted of twelve senators for each of the six states of Australia and two senators representing each of the Northern Territory and the Australian Capital Territory. All members were elected at the 1987 election following a double dissolution of both houses of parliament, rather than the normal case of only half of the state senators facing election.

In accordance with section 13 of the Constitution, following a double dissolution of Parliament, the terms for senators commence on 1 July preceding the election – i.e., on 1 July 1987.  The Senate decides which senators were allocated the full six-year terms ending on 30 June 1993 and which senators were allocated three-year terms ending on 30 June 1990. In 1983 the Commonwealth Electoral Act 1918 had been amended to include provision for a recount of ballot papers to determine the senators to get the long term vacancies. This was the result of a unanimous recommendation from the Joint Select Committee on Electoral Reform. Despite the unanimous recommendation for reform,  and the  maintained the previous system where the first six senators elected in each state were allocated the full six-year terms ending on 30 June 1993 while the other half were allocated three-year terms ending on 30 June 1990. The effect of this system was that Democrat Senators Paul McLean and Janet Powell got a long term instead of National Senators David Brownhill and Julian McGauran. There was no net effect on Labor and Liberal in that in South Australia, Labor Senator Graham Maguire got a long term instead of Liberal Senator Robert Hill, while in Queensland, Liberal Senator Warwick Parer got a long term instead of Labor Senator Gerry Jones. Senators took their seats immediately following the election on 11 July 1987.  The four territory senators were elected in July 1987 and their terms ended at the next federal election, which was March 1990.

Notes

References

Members of Australian parliaments by term
20th-century Australian politicians
Australian Senate lists